The 2021 season for the  was the 30th season in the team's existence and the 16th consecutive season that it was a UCI WorldTeam. French automobile manufacturer Citroën joined as a title sponsor, alongside longtime title sponsor AG2R La Mondiale, a French insurance firm.

Team roster 

Riders who joined the team for the 2021 season

Riders who left the team during or after the 2020 season

Season victories

References

External links 

 

2021 road cycling season by team
2021
2021 in French sport